The 8th Pan American Games were held in San Juan, Puerto Rico from July 1 to July 15, 1979. Antigua and Barbuda made its debut at the Pan American Games.

Results by event

See also
Antigua and Barbuda at the 1976 Summer Olympics

References

Nations at the 1979 Pan American Games
Pan American Games
1979